1297 Quadea, provisional designation , is an Eoan asteroid from the outer regions of the asteroid belt, approximately 23 kilometers in diameter. It was discovered on 7 January 1934, by astronomer Karl Reinmuth at the Heidelberg-Königstuhl State Observatory in Germany. The asteroid was named for the parents-in-law of the discoverer's brother.

Orbit and classification 

Quadea is a member the Eos family, the largest asteroid family in the outer main belt consisting of nearly 10,000 known asteroids. It orbits the Sun at a distance of 2.8–3.2 AU once every 5 years and 3 months (1,917 days). Its orbit has an eccentricity of 0.07 and an inclination of 9° with respect to the ecliptic.

Physical characteristics 

Quadea has been characterized as a carbonaceous C-type asteroid by PanSTARRS photometric survey. The asteroid is also an assumed S-type asteroid, while the overall spectral type for members of the Eos family is that of a K-type, with albedos in-between the S-and C-types.

Rotation period 

Since 2006, several rotational lightcurves of Quadea have obtained by astronomers Pierre Antonini and Brian Warner, as well as from photometric observations at the Palomar Transient Factory, California, and the Oakley Southern Sky Observatory in Australia. Analysis of the best-rated lightcurve gave a well-defined rotation period of 6.267 hours and a brightness variation of 0.35 magnitude.

Diameter and albedo 

According to the survey carried out by the NEOWISE mission of NASA's Wide-field Infrared Survey Explorer, Quadea measures between 19.62 and 22.42 kilometers in diameter and its surface has an albedo between 0.1551 and 0.200, while the Japanese Akari satellite found a diameter of 24.7 kilometers with an albedo of 0.142. The Collaborative Asteroid Lightcurve Link assumes an albedo of 0.14 and calculates a diameter of 23.47 kilometers based on an absolute magnitude of 10.9.

Naming 

This minor planet was named by the discoverer after the parents-in-law of his brother, E. Reinmuth. The official naming citation was mentioned in The Names of the Minor Planets by Paul Herget in 1955.

Notes

References

External links 
 Asteroid Lightcurve Database (LCDB), query form (info )
 Dictionary of Minor Planet Names, Google books
 Asteroids and comets rotation curves, CdR – Observatoire de Genève, Raoul Behrend
 Discovery Circumstances: Numbered Minor Planets (1)-(5000) – Minor Planet Center
 
 

001297
Discoveries by Karl Wilhelm Reinmuth
Named minor planets
19340107